The 2003–04 Umaglesi Liga was the fifteenth season of top-tier football in Georgia. It began on 26 July 2003 and ended on 30 May 2004 with a championship playoff match. Dinamo Tbilisi were the defending champions.

Locations

First stage

League table

Results

Second stage

Championship group

Table

Results

Relegation group

Table

Results

Champions playoff

Relegation play-offs

Top goalscorers

See also
2003–04 Pirveli Liga
2003–04 Georgian Cup

References

External links 
Georgia - List of final tables (RSSSF)

Erovnuli Liga seasons
1
Georgia